The 2019–20 Maltese FA Trophy was the 82nd edition of the football cup competition. 

Balzan  were the defending champions, but were eliminated in the quarter-finals by Pietà Hotspurs.

On 18 May 2020, the Malta FA Executive Committee decided to terminate the competition due to the  COVID-19 pandemic.

Format 

The clubs in the Premier League, First Division, Second Division and Third Division together with those from the Gozo Football League are involved in the draws of the initial rounds. The 14 top-flight sides enter the fray in the third round. Matches which are level after regulation advanced to extra time and afterwards to penalties to determine a winner, when needed.

Schedule 

The draws were made on 6 August 2018 and were conducted by Dr. Angelo Chetcuti, the General Secretary of the Malta Football Association, and Rodney Pisani, the Deputy General Secretary of the Association who leads the Competitions Department.

Preliminary round 

Eight preliminary round matches were played on 6 till 9 September 2019. The draw for the preliminary, first, and second rounds was held on 8 August 2019.

First round 

Nine first round matches were played on 13 till 16 September 2019. The draw for the preliminary, first, and second rounds was held  8 August 2019.

Second round 

Eighteen second round matches were played on 25 and 28 October 2019. The draw for the preliminary, first, and second rounds was held 8 August 2019. All teams from Maltese First Division and Maltese Second Division entered in the Second round. In the Second Round there are 2 clubs from Maltese Third Division and 5 clubs from Gozo Football League First Division left.

Third round 
Sixteen third round matches were played on 29 November and 1 December 2019. The draw for the third and fourth rounds was held on 6 November 2019. All teams from Maltese Premier League entered in Third round.
The top six position from 2018-19 Maltese Premier League teams that are seeded in the third round of the FA Trophy. A total of thirty-two clubs will be involved in the draw. In the Third Round there are 9 clubs from Maltese First Division, 5 clubs from Maltese Second Division and 4 clubs from Gozo Football League First Division left.

Fourth round 
Eight Fourth round matches were played on 24-26 January 2020. The draw for the third and fourth rounds was held on 6 November 2019. In the Fourth Round there are 11 clubs from Maltese Premier League, 3 clubs from Maltese First Division and 2 clubs from Gozo Football League First Division left.

Quarter-finals
Four quarter-final matches were scheduled on 29 February and 1 March 2020. The draw for the quarter-finals will be held on 31 January 2020. In the Quarter-finals there are 7 clubs from Maltese Premier League and 1 club from Maltese First Division left.

Semi-finals
Two semi-final matches was going to play on May 2020 at National Stadium, Ta' Qali. On 18 May 2020, the Malta FA Executive Committee decided to terminate the competition due to the  COVID-19 pandemic.

Television rights
The following matches were broadcast live on TVM2:

See also 
 2019–20 Maltese Premier League

References

External links 
 Official FA Trophy website
 The Maltese FA Trophy on UEFA

Malta
Maltese FA Trophy seasons
Cup
Maltese FA Trophy